Opistocystidae is a family of annelids belonging to the order Haplotaxida.

Genera:
 Crustipellis Harman & Loden, 1978
 Opistocysta Černosvitov, 1936
 Trieminentia Harman & Loden, 1978

References

Haplotaxida